Wife Against Wife is a 1921 American drama film directed by Whitman Bennett and written by Dorothy Farnum. It is based on the 1911 play The Price by George Broadhurst. The film stars Pauline Starke, Percy Marmont, Edward Langford, Emily Fitzroy and Ottola Nesmith. The film was released on September 12, 1921, by Associated First National Pictures.

Cast      
Pauline Starke as Gabrielle Gautier
Percy Marmont as Stannard Dole
Edward Langford as Dr. Ethan Bristol
Emily Fitzroy as Mrs. Dole
Ottola Nesmith as Florence Bromley

References

External links
 

1921 films
1920s English-language films
Silent American drama films
1921 drama films
First National Pictures films
American silent feature films
American black-and-white films
Films directed by Whitman Bennett
1920s American films